Archibald McCall (8 May 1867 – 17 April 1936) was a Scottish footballer, who played for Renton and Scotland.

References

Sources

External links

London Hearts profile (Scotland)
London Hearts profile (Scottish League)

1867 births
1936 deaths
Scottish footballers
Scotland international footballers
Renton F.C. players
Association football fullbacks
Association football wing halves
Scottish Football League players
Scottish Football League representative players
People from Renton, West Dunbartonshire
Footballers from West Dunbartonshire